The Conrad discontinuity corresponds to the sub-horizontal boundary in the continental crust at which the seismic wave velocity increases in a discontinuous way. This boundary is observed in various continental regions at a depth of 15 to 20 km, but it is not found in oceanic regions.

The Conrad discontinuity (named after the seismologist Victor Conrad) is considered to be the border between the upper continental crust and the lower one. It is not as pronounced as the Mohorovičić discontinuity, and absent in some continental regions. Up to the middle 20th Century the upper crust in continental regions was seen to consist of felsic rocks such as granite (sial, for silica-aluminium), and the lower one to consist of more magnesium-rich mafic rocks like basalt (sima, for silica-magnesium). Therefore, the seismologists of that time considered that the Conrad discontinuity should correspond to a sharply defined contact between the chemically distinct two layers, sial and sima.

However, from the 1960s onward this theory was strongly contested among geologists. The exact geological significance of the Conrad discontinuity is still not clarified. The possibility that it represents the transition from amphibolite facies to granulite facies metamorphism has been given some support from observations of the uplifted central part of the Vredefort impact structure and the surrounding Kaapvaal Craton.

References

Plate tectonics
Structure of the Earth
Earth's crust